Qatar International School (QIS) is a British patterned international school which follows the IGCSE/A-levels system. It is located in downtown Doha. The school provides education from reception to year 13.

External links 

 

British international schools in Qatar
Schools in Qatar
International schools in Qatar